, from Portuguese Let's Go! is a Japanese manga series written and illustrated by Yoshimi Osada. It has been published in France by Bamboo Édition, under their manga imprint Doki Doki.

Plot 
Yu Kamazaki is a schoolgirl who lacks confidence in herself and fears the gaze of others. Rather aggressive, this does not let anyone near her. However, she becomes fascinated by the personality of Asami Kume, a dynamic and popular girl, and joins the futsal club that is played on the roof of the school. She is surprised to love the sport, yet collective and enjoys the company of other players.

References

External links
 Official website at Doki Doki 
 Review of volume 1 at ActuaBD 
 Review of volume 2 at ActuaBD 
  Review of volume 1 at Manga-News 
  Review of volume 2 at Manga-News 
  Review of volume 3 at Manga-News 
  Review of volume 2 at Anime Land 
 Review of volume 2 at BDaBD 

Association football in anime and manga
2008 manga
Seinen manga